CSM Corona Brașov, formerly known as Rulmentul Brașov, is a professional women's handball club in Brașov, Romania, that plays in the Divizia A.

Kits

Sports Hall information

Name: – Sala Sporturilor "Dumitru Popescu Colibași"
City: – Brașov
Capacity: – 1700
Address: – Bulevardul Gării nr. 21, Brașov, Romania

Honours   
Challenge Cup:
Winners (1): 2006
Cup Winners' Cup:
Runners-Up: 2008
EHF Champions League:
Third place: 1982
EHF Cup:
Third place: 2009, 2016
Liga Naţională:
Winners (2): 1981, 2006
Runners-Up: 1984, 1986, 2007, 2008, 2009, 2014
Third place: 1983, 1987, 2015, 2016
Cupa României:
Winners (2): 1981, 2006
Runners-Up: 1984, 1995, 2007, 2013
Third place: 2014

Team

Current squad

Squad for the 2022-23 season

Goalkeepers 
 16  Raluca Rădoi
 90  Elena Voicu

Wingers
Left Wings

 19  Alexandra Dumitrașcu
 20  Cristina Iordachi
 22  Oana Cîrstea

Right Wings
 44  Flavia Munteanu
 66  Natália Kamalandua
Line players  
 6  Diana Golanu
 17  Bianca Voica

CB
 7  Carla Lăcătuș
 21  Macarena Gandulfo
 99  Raissa Marin
 10  Medea Iordan
Left Backs
 13  Ana Maria Văcariu
 28  Laura Lasm
 30  Patricia Moraru
Right Backs 
 11  Wuta Dombaxe
 23  Ana Maria Berbece

Transfers
Transfers for the 2023–24 season

 Joining
  Anica Gudelj (GK) (from  SV Union Halle-Neustadt e.V.) 
  Bobana Klikovac (LP) (from  SCM Râmnicu Vâlcea) 
  Matea Pletikosić (CB) (from  ŽRK Budućnost Podgorica) 
  Alisia Boiciuc (CB) (from  CNOPJ Baia Mare) 
  Ștefania Lazăr (RW) (from  Dacia Mioveni) 

 Leaving

Notable managers 
 Dumitru Popescu-Colibași
 Mariana Tîrcă
 Bogdan Burcea
 Herbert Müller

Notable players 
 Irene Oancea
 Mariana Tîrcă
 Paula Ungureanu
 Andreea Pricopi
 Patricia Vizitiu    
 Cristina Neagu 
 Simona Gogîrlă 
 Denisa Dedu 
 Laura Chiper 
 Camelia Hotea  
 Cristina Zamfir   
 Ionica Munteanu  
 Adriana Țăcălie    
 Sorina Tîrcă  
 Eliza Buceschi
 Daria Bucur
 Ionela Stanca
 Carmen Amariei
 Gabriela Rotiș  
 Simona Spiridon  
 Woo Sun-hee
 Chung Eun-hee
 Alexandrina Barbosa 
 Gabriella Juhász 
 Lidija Horvat 
 Natalia Spirova 
 Miriam Simaková

External links
 

 

Romanian handball clubs
Handball clubs established in 1960
Liga Națională (women's handball) clubs
Sport in Brașov
1960 establishments in Romania